The Terminal Tower (also known as Le 800 René Lévesque) is a skyscraper in downtown Montreal, Quebec, Canada. Completed in 1966, it was the last phase of CN's developments in the area, along with the Queen Elizabeth Hotel, Central Station and the CN Building. It was built in the international-style architecture, with a concrete and glass facade. The Terminal Tower is located at 800 René Lévesque Boulevard West opposite Place Ville-Marie, and next to the Queen Elizabeth Hotel.

Tenants
Numeris/BBM Canada
Bombardier Inc.
Ernst & Young
Tembec
Transport Canada

See also
 List of tallest buildings in Montreal

References

External links
 Polaris Realty | Properties > 800 René-Lévesque West

Skyscrapers in Montreal
Office buildings completed in 1966
Modernist architecture in Canada
Skyscraper office buildings in Canada
Downtown Montreal